The Turkish Airlines Challenge is a golf tournament on the Challenge Tour, played in Turkey. It was first played in 2010 when Charlie Ford triumphed in a sudden-death playoff over Oscar Florén. It returned in 2014.

Winners

Notes

External links

Coverage on the Challenge Tour's site

Former Challenge Tour events
Golf tournaments in Turkey
Recurring sporting events established in 2010
2010 establishments in Turkey